Atractaspis boulengeri, also known commonly as Boulenger's mole viper, the Central African burrowing asp, and simply the mole viper, is a species of venomous snake in the subfamily Atractaspidinae of the family Lamprophiidae. The species is endemic to Africa. There are six recognized subspecies.

Geographic range
A. boulengeri is found in Angola, Cameroon, Central African Republic, Republic of the Congo, Democratic Republic of the Congo, and Gabon.

Habitat

Reproduction
A. boulengeri is oviparous.

Subspecies
The following six subspecies, including the nominotypical subspecies, are recognized as being valid.
Atractaspis boulengeri boulengeri 
Atractaspis boulengeri matschiensis 
Atractaspis boulengeri mixta 
Atractaspis boulengeri schmidti 
Atractaspis boulengeri schultzei 
Atractaspis boulengeri vanderborghti

Etymology
The specific epithet, boulengeri, is in honor of Belgian-British herpetologist George Albert Boulenger.

References

Further reading
Laurent RF (1945). "Contribution a la connaissance du Genre Atractaspis A. Smith ". Revue de zoologie et botanique africaines 38: 312–343. (Atractaspis boulengeri mixta, new subspecies; A. b. schmidti, new subspecies). (in French).
Laurent RF (1956). "Contribution à l'herpétologie de la région des Grandes Lacs de l'Afrique centrale ". Annales du Musée Royal du Congo Belge 48: 1–390. (Atractaspis boulengeri vanderborghti, new subspecies). (in French).
Mocquard F (1897). "Sur une collection de Reptiles recueillis par M. Haug, à Lambaréné ". Bulletin de la Société Philomathique de Paris, Huitième Série [Eighth Series] 9: 5-20. (Atractaspis boulengeri, new species, pp. 16–17). (in French).
Sternfeld R (1917). "Reptilia und Amphibia ". pp. 407–510. In: Schubotz JH (1917). Wissenschaftliche Ergebnisse der Zweiten Deutschen Zentral-Afrika-Expedition, 1910–1911 unter Führung Adolph Friedrichs, Herzog zu Mecklenburg. Band I. Zoologie. Leipzig: Klinkhardt & Biermann. 579 pp. (Atractaspis schultzei, new species, pp. 489–490). (in German).
Werner F (1897). "Ueber Reptilien und Batrachier aus Togoland, Kamerun und Tunis aus dem kgl. Museum für Naturkunde in Berlin ". Verhandlungen der Kaiserlich-Königlichen Zoologisch-Botanischen Gesellschaft in Wien 47: 395–407 + Plate II. (Atractaspis matschiensis, new species, p. 404 + Plate II, figures 1a, 1b). (in German).

Atractaspididae
Reptiles described in 1897